The 113th New York State Legislature, consisting of the New York State Senate and the New York State Assembly, met from January 7 to May 9, 1890, during the sixth year of David B. Hill's governorship, in Albany.

Background
Under the provisions of the New York Constitution of 1846, 32 Senators and 128 assemblymen were elected in single-seat districts; senators for a two-year term, assemblymen for a one-year term. The senatorial districts were made up of entire counties, except New York County (seven districts) and Kings County (three districts). The Assembly districts were made up of entire towns, or city wards, forming a contiguous area, all within the same county.

At this time there were two major political parties: the Democratic Party and the Republican Party. In New York City, the Democrats were split into two factions: Tammany Hall and the "County Democracy". The Prohibition Party and the Greenback Party also nominated state tickets.

Elections
The New York state election, 1889 was held on November 5. All six statewide elective office up for election was carried by the Democrats. The approximate party strength at this election, as expressed by the vote for Secretary of State, was: Democrats 506,000; Republicans 485,000; Prohibition 27,000; and Greenback 1,000.

Sessions
The Legislature met for the regular session at the State Capitol in Albany on January 7, 1890; and adjourned on May 9.

James W. Husted (R) was again elected Speaker, against William F. Sheehan (D).

Jacob Sloat Fassett (R) was re-elected President pro tempore of the State Senate.

State Senate

Districts

Note: There are now 62 counties in the State of New York. The counties which are not mentioned in this list had not yet been established, or sufficiently organized, the area being included in one or more of the abovementioned counties.

Members
The asterisk (*) denotes members of the previous Legislature who continued in office as members of this Legislature. Patrick H. McCarren, George F. Roesch, Harvey J. Donaldson, Charles T. Saxton and Greenleaf S. Van Gorder changed from the Assembly to the Senate.

Employees
 Clerk: John S. Kenyon
 Sergeant-at-Arms: Charles V. Schram
 Doorkeeper: Edward R. Gibbons
 Stenographer: George H. Thornton

State Assembly

Assemblymen
The asterisk (*) denotes members of the previous Legislature who continued as members of this Legislature.

Employees
 Clerk: Charles A. Chickering
 Sergeant-at-Arms: James H. Manville
 Doorkeeper: Homer B. Webb
 Stenographer: Isaac H. Smith

Notes

Sources
 The New York Red Book compiled by Edgar L. Murlin (published by James B. Lyon, Albany NY, 1897; see pg. 384f for senate districts; pg. 403 for senators; pg. 410–417 for Assembly districts; and pg. 507f for assemblymen)
 Biographical sketches of the members of the Legislature in The Evening Journal Almanac (1890)

113
1890 in New York (state)
1890 U.S. legislative sessions